Søholm is a listed Neoclassical house overlooking Lake Emdrup in Hellerup in northern Copenhagen, Denmark. The current main building and a three-winged , thatched stable on a nearby site were both constructed in 180608 for the Jewish merchant Joseph Nathan David to designs by Christian Frederik Hansen. The main building was listed in the Danish registry of protected buildings and places in 1918.

History

Oruguns
The first country house on the site was established by cassier in the Danish Asiatic Company Jacob Holm in 1773. The house was located in a small woodland on the shore of Lundehussøen as Emdrup Lake was known in that day. Holm resided at Søholm in the summer time until he was arrested for fraud in 1785.

David and the new building
 

In 1802, Søholm was acquired by the Jewish merchant Joseph Nathan David (1758–1839).  Yje cirremt building on the site was constructed for him in 1806-1809. It was Christian Frederik Hansen's first building to be completed after his move from Schleswig-Holstein to Copenahgen. The two one-story side wings were added in 1858. Favid was originally from Altona and was therefore no doubt already familiar with his work.

David spent the summers at Søholm and the winters at Kronprinsessegade 30, which would later be converted into The Favid Collection by his great-grandson C.L. David.

Changing owners
 
The estate was later acquired by Alphonse Casadaban. In 1830, he unsuccessfully tried to convert it into a summer destination for Copenhagen's bourgeoisie.

In 1877, Søholm was acquired by Niels Andersen. He owned it until his death in 1911. The building was renovated by Gotfred Tvede in 1912–15. A later owner was CEO P. Christiansen.

20th century
The property was later turned into a senior citizens home. It was acquired by Arkitekternes Pensionskasse  in 1982 and subsequently restored.

Today
The property consists of 848 m2 office space and a 152 m2 residence. It is currently the Headquarter office of the company Bjørn Thorsen A/S  and its affiliate companies Nordic Grafting Company A/S (NGC)  Customized Compound Solutions A/S (CCS), Klarsø A/S, Nordic Formulation Technology A/S and Digital Serigraphic Technologies A/S (DST).

References

External links
 Vintage photos from Dansk Kulturarv
  Bjørn Thorsen A/S - distributor of raw materials

Listed buildings and structures in Gentofte Municipality
Houses in Gentofte Municipality
Houses completed in 1809
Christian Frederik Hansen buildings